Standing eight may refer to:
 An aerobatic maneuver
 Standing eight count in boxing